The Tampa Bay Buccaneers are a professional American football team based in Tampa, Florida. The Buccaneers compete in the National Football League (NFL) as a member club of the league's National Football Conference (NFC) South division. Prior to the  season, Tampa Bay switched conferences and divisions with Seattle, becoming a member of the NFC Central division. As a result of the league's realignment prior to the  season, the Buccaneers joined three former NFC West teams to form the NFC South. The club is owned by the Glazer family and plays its home games at Raymond James Stadium in Tampa.

The Buccaneers have won two Super Bowl championships and, along with the Baltimore Ravens, are the only two NFL franchises who are undefeated in multiple Super Bowl appearances. They were regarded as a perennial losing franchise for most of their first two decades due to suffering 26 consecutive losses in their first two seasons (including a winless inaugural season) and 14 consecutive losing seasons from 1983 to 1996. Despite these early struggles, Tampa Bay is the first post-merger expansion team to clinch a division title, win a playoff game, and host a conference championship; feats they accomplished by their fourth season in 1979. The team's image improved by the time of their first championship in 2002, also the first for a franchise built after the merger, but they would not win another playoff game until their second Super Bowl championship season in 2020. Concurrent to the lack of success outside of their Super Bowl wins, the Buccaneers hold the NFL's lowest winning percentage at .404.

Franchise history

Hugh Culverhouse era (1976–1994)

John McKay years (1976–1984) 
The Buccaneers joined the NFL as members of the AFC West in 1976. The following year, they were moved to the NFC Central, while the other 1976 expansion team, the Seattle Seahawks, switched conferences with Tampa Bay and joined the AFC West. This realignment was dictated by the league as part of the 1976 expansion plan, so that both teams could play each other twice and every other NFL franchise once during their first two seasons. Instead of a traditional schedule of playing each division opponent twice, the Buccaneers played every conference team once, plus the Seahawks.

Tampa Bay did not win their first game until the 13th week of their second season, starting with a record of 0–26 (though the Bucs had beaten the Atlanta Falcons, 17–3, in a 1976 pre-season game before their first regular season). Until the Detroit Lions in 2008, the 1976 Bucs were the only Super Bowl-era team to go winless in a whole season. Their losing streak caused them to become the butt of late-night television comedians' jokes. Their first win came in December 1977, on the road against the New Orleans Saints. The Saints' head coach, Hank Stram, was fired after losing to the Buccaneers. Tampa Bay needed one more week to get their second victory, a home win over the St. Louis Cardinals in the 1977 season finale. The Cardinals also fired their coach, Don Coryell, shortly afterward.
The Bucs' situation improved rapidly in the 1979 season. With the maturation of quarterback Doug Williams and future four-time Pro Bowl tight end Jimmie Giles, the first 1,000-yard rushing season from running back Ricky Bell, and a smothering, league-leading defense led by future NFL Hall of Famer Lee Roy Selmon, the Bucs kicked off the season with five consecutive victories, a performance that landed them on the cover of Sports Illustrated.

With four games left in the season, the Bucs needed to win only one of them to make the playoffs. In the first, STP was put all over the goal posts in Tampa to prevent the goalposts from being ripped down in the event of a celebration. Four blocked kicks later, the Bucs wasted the oily substance, falling to the Minnesota Vikings 23–22. STP was wasted again the following week as the Bucs were shut out 14–0 by the Chicago Bears; and in O. J. Simpson's final home game in San Francisco, Tampa Bay lost its third straight attempt to clinch a division title against a 49ers team which came in with a 1–13 record. However, in the season finale at home against the Kansas City Chiefs, which was played in the worst downpour in Bucs history, Tampa Bay pulled out a 3–0 victory. Finishing with a 10–6 record, the Bucs had their first winning season in franchise history, and won the Central Division in a tiebreaker over the Bears. In an upset, the Bucs defeated the Philadelphia Eagles 24–17 in the divisional round of the playoffs. Because the Los Angeles Rams defeated the Dallas Cowboys in the other NFC playoff game, the Bucs hosted the NFC Championship Game the following week in Tampa. The Bucs lost to the Rams 9–0. In their fourth season, the Bucs seemed on the verge of fulfilling McKay's five-year plan.

The Bucs made the playoffs again by winning their division in the 1981 season. It came down to a thrilling final game at Detroit; the winner would take the Central Division crown and the loser would miss the playoffs. The Detroit Lions had not lost at home all season. Although the Bucs trailed early, an 84-yard touchdown bomb from QB Williams to WR Kevin House and a fumble recovery for a touchdown by DT David Logan sealed the win for the Bucs. In the playoffs, the Cowboys defeated the Bucs, 38–0, in the divisional round.

The 1982 season started 0–3 for the Bucs, before a player's strike shut down the NFL for seven weeks. When the league resumed play, the Bucs were nicknamed the "Cardiac Kids" for winning five of their next six games, all in the final moments, to go 5–4 and qualify for the expanded playoff slate. In the first round, the Bucs once again faced the Cowboys at Dallas, losing 30–17. As it turned out, this would be the last winning regular season under Culverhouse's ownership.

Before the 1983 season, Williams bolted to the United States Football League in a salary dispute. The Bucs lost their first nine games of the 1983 season en route to finishing 2–14, the first of 12 consecutive seasons with at least ten losses—an NFL record. Included was the drafting of Heisman Trophy winner Bo Jackson with the first pick in the 1986 draft. Jackson had let it be known that he would never play a down for Hugh Culverhouse at Tampa Bay. Making good on his threat, he opted instead to play baseball for the Kansas City Royals and would later return for parts of football seasons with the Los Angeles Raiders. Along with Williams, who later was a Super Bowl champion QB for Washington, two other Buc quarterbacks during this era led other teams to Super Bowl wins. Steve Young won with the 49ers and Trent Dilfer won with the Baltimore Ravens.

Under Culverhouse, the Bucs were one of the NFL's more profitable teams during the 1980s; however, this was largely because he kept the payroll among the lowest in the league, hampering their ability to sign quality players. Attendance also sagged; at one point the Buccaneers went parts of three whole seasons without having a home game televised locally, and when they did it was more attributed to a strong visiting team with a large following in the area, such as the Chicago Bears or Green Bay Packers.

Hardy Nickerson, a future five-time Pro Bowl linebacker, signed as a free agent from the Pittsburgh Steelers. John Lynch, a future Pro Bowl strong safety, was drafted in 1993. In the 1995 NFL draft the Buccaneers drafted two future Hall of Famers: Warren Sapp and Derrick Brooks. Pro Bowl Fullback, Mike Alstott, was drafted the next year in the 1996 draft.

Glazer family era (1995–present)
Despite the profitability of the Buccaneers in the 1980s, Culverhouse's death in 1994 revealed a man close to bankruptcy despite having a low payroll for his team. His son, Miami attorney Hugh Culverhouse Jr. soon sued his father's associates (Stephen Story, Jack Donlan, and Fred Cone) who had built the trust account that was meant to manage the elder Culverhouse's business (which involved a $350 million estate) after having his wife sign a post-nuptial agreement. At any rate, a settlement was soon reached that gave control of the trust to Culverhouse Jr., who sold the team for $192 million. Interested parties included New York Yankees owner George Steinbrenner and Baltimore Orioles owner Peter Angelos, the latter of whom publicly declared he would move the team to Baltimore, as the city did not have an NFL franchise at that time.

However, in a last-minute surprise, real estate magnate Malcolm Glazer outbid both of them for $192 million, the highest sale price for a professional sports franchise up to that point. Glazer immediately placed his sons Bryan, Edward, and Joel in charge of the team's financial affairs. He stated that he had every intention of keeping the team in Tampa, but informed area citizens its current stadium deal would not support the record paid amount and that a new stadium would be required. The Glazers convinced Hillsborough County voters to raise sales taxes to fund the construction of what would become Raymond James Stadium.

Tony Dungy years (1996–2001) 
The Glazers' deep pockets and serious commitment to fielding a winning team–in Tampa Bay–finally allowed the Bucs to become competitive. The team's performance dramatically improved when the Glazers hired Minnesota Vikings defensive coordinator Tony Dungy as head coach. Additionally, the team jettisoned the old uniform designs in favor of a modern look.

During Dungy's first season in 1996, the team continued to struggle, starting the season 1–8. But in the second half of the season, they finished 5–2, primarily due to the performance of a defense ranked seventh in the NFL led by Hardy Nickerson and the maturing of Sam Wyche's draftees Brooks, Lynch, and Sapp. Dungy, with his even-tempered personality, quickly brought balance and morale to the team, and his Cover 2 defensive scheme, sharpened to perfection by defensive coordinator Monte Kiffin and linebackers coach Lovie Smith, became the foundation for Tampa Bay's future success. Their version of Cover 2 was so successful that it became known as the Tampa 2. It has been brought to the Chicago Bears by Smith, Detroit Lions by Rod Marinelli, Kansas City Chiefs by Herman Edwards and to the Indianapolis Colts by Dungy himself, and copied by several other teams.

The team started the 1997 season 5–0, picking up where they left off the previous year, and this quick start once again landed them on the cover of Sports Illustrated twice.  The Bucs went 10–6 for their first winning season and playoff appearance since 1982, as a wild-card team. In the Bucs' final home game at Houlihan's Stadium (formerly Tampa Stadium), the team defeated the Lions 20–10. They lost at Lambeau Field to the eventual NFC champion Packers 21–7. Still, there was reason for optimism, and the expectations were high for the following season.

The 1998 season, the first to be played in the newly constructed Raymond James Stadium, saw the Bucs lose several close games en route to a disappointing 8–8 record. The Bucs had to play the first six football games of the year (including preseason) on the road, as the new stadium was not quite finished.

The 1999 season brought much better fortune. On the strength of the NFL's number 3 overall defense and a performance by rookie quarterback Shaun King, the Bucs finished the season with an 11–5 record and won their third NFC Central Division Championship. They beat the Washington Redskins 14–13 in the Divisional round, before losing to the eventual Super Bowl Champion St. Louis Rams in a low-scoring NFC Championship Game, 11–6. The Bucs' loss was controversial, highlighted by the reversal of a pass from King to wide receiver Bert Emanuel, which ended the Bucs' chances at continuing their last-minute drive. In league meetings following the season, the NFL changed the rules regarding what constituted an incomplete pass.

While the Bucs played well in 2000 and 2001 and made the playoffs in each season, they were unable to fulfill their primary goal of a Super Bowl victory. The wild card spots that Tampa Bay earned forced them to go on the road for their postseason opener in each year, and both road games took them into frigid Philadelphia to play the Eagles.

Jon Gruden years (2002–2008) 

Dungy was fired by the Buccaneers following a 31–9 loss to the Philadelphia Eagles in the Wildcard Round of 2001 and soon thereafter hired as the head coach of the Indianapolis Colts, while the Bucs mounted a search for his replacement that would include numerous names and rejections. Several potential candidates were offered the job, including University of Florida head coach (and former Buccaneers quarterback) Steve Spurrier, former New York Giants head coach Bill Parcells, and Baltimore Ravens defensive coordinator Marvin Lewis. Spurrier jumped to the Redskins when he was offered the most lucrative salary package ever offered to an NFL head coach, and Parcells eventually passed on the Bucs' offer—the second time he had done so in the history of the franchise. Bucs' general manager Rich McKay threw his support behind Lewis. The Glazer brothers were so displeased with the selection of yet another defensive-minded coach that they overruled McKay and took control of the candidate search themselves. They made it clear that their top choice was Jon Gruden; however, he was still under contract with the Oakland Raiders.

While talks with the Raiders were secretly underway, the Glazers publicly pursued another respected offensive mind, San Francisco 49ers head coach Steve Mariucci. Just when initial reports indicated that Mariucci had agreed to become both the Bucs' head coach and their general manager, Raiders owner Al Davis agreed to release Gruden to Tampa Bay.

The Glazers' shrewd move eventually paid off in acquiring Gruden, but it was costly. The team hired Gruden away from the Raiders on February 20, 2002, but the price was four draft picks, including the Bucs' first and second-round picks in 2002, their first-round pick in 2003, and their second-round selection in 2004, along with $8 million in cash. (The league as a result prohibited any further trading of draft picks for coaches.) Gruden was frustrated by the limitation of his coaching authority by Davis and was more than pleased to return to Tampa Bay. His parents lived in Carrollwood, and he had spent part of his childhood in Tampa in the early 1980s when his father was a running backs coach and later a scout for the Bucs.

Upon his arrival in Tampa, Gruden immediately went to work, retooling a sluggish offense, changing over 50% of the starting offense. With a new Tailback, Wide Receiver, Two Tight Ends, Left Tackle, and Left Guard, Gruden put his stamp on the teams offense to remove the "Dungy's Team" label. The league's sweeping realignment sent the Bucs to the new NFC South Division, along with the Falcons, Carolina Panthers and New Orleans Saints.

Super Bowl XXXVII champions (2002) 

Led by the league's top defense, the 2002 season was the Buccaneers' most successful to date. Linebacker Derrick Brooks was named the NFL Defensive Player of the Year with a tendency to make big plays. They won the NFC South title with the team's best ever record, 12–4, and scored more points in two playoff wins over the 49ers and Eagles than in Bucs playoff history combined. The Philadelphia Eagles were a thorn in Tampa Bay's side, having eliminated the Bucs in each of the last two seasons' wild card games. Tampa Bay entered the game as heavy underdogs and fell behind early. However, the Bucs persevered and took a ten-point lead into the fourth quarter. Ronde Barber sealed the win in dramatic fashion with a late interception return for a touchdown, and a 27–10 victory. The Bucs then went on to rout Gruden's former team, the Raiders, who had the league's number one offense, by a score of 48–21 in Super Bowl XXXVII, nicknamed 'The Pirate Bowl'.

Soon after the Super Bowl victory, a growing number of press reports indicated Gruden's lack of patience with general manager McKay, a major architect of the Bucs' rebuilding effort over the previous ten years. McKay, like Gruden, had long-established ties to the Tampa Bay area. However, during the 2003 season, the Gruden-McKay relationship deteriorated as the Bucs struggled on the field. In November, Keyshawn Johnson was deactivated by the team ten games into the season for his conduct, which included sideline arguments with Bucs coaches and players. Johnson was eventually traded to the Dallas Cowboys for wide receiver Joey Galloway, who later in his career played for the New England Patriots, Pittsburgh Steelers, and Washington Redskins.

In December, the Glazers allowed McKay to leave the Bucs before the end of the regular season, and he promptly joined the Falcons as president and general manager. Thus, McKay watched his first game as a Falcons executive sitting next to owner Arthur Blank in a Raymond James Stadium skybox. The Falcons defeated the Bucs 30–28. The Bucs suffered a sluggish start and finished the season 7–9. With the Raiders' dismal 4–12 performance, neither Super Bowl team reached the playoffs that year.

For 2004, Bruce Allen was hired as general manager. After Allen's arrival, both John Lynch and Warren Sapp were released, stunning many Buccaneer fans. The distracted Buccaneers began the 2004 season with a 1–5 record, their worst start under Gruden. The fading accuracy of kicker Martín Gramática did not help matters, as the team lost many close games en route to a 5–11 record.

In the 2005 season, the Buccaneers celebrated their 30th season in the league, and returned to their winning ways. The Bucs selected Carnell "Cadillac" Williams in the first round of the 2005 draft, and the rookie would provide a running game the Buccaneers had not possessed since the days of James Wilder Sr. in the 1980s. Williams would later go on to receive the NFL Offensive Rookie of the Year Award.  After starting 5–1, the team entered a midseason slump hampered by a season-ending injury to starting QB Brian Griese. Replacement starter Chris Simms struggled early, but came into his own, leading the team to a last-minute win over the Redskins. The Bucs won the NFC South Division finishing 11–5. The season ended abruptly, however, with a 17–10 loss in the Wild Card round, in a rematch with Washington that saw receiver Edell Shepherd drop the game-winning catch in the endzone.

After winning the division in 2005, the Bucs suffered through an abysmal 2006 season. The season was plagued by injuries, with starters such as guard Dan Buenning, wide receiver Michael Clayton, running back Cadillac Williams, defensive end Simeon Rice, cornerback Brian Kelly, and quarterback Chris Simms all being placed on injured reserve at some point in the season. The season also saw a lot of rookies starting for the Bucs, such as quarterback Bruce Gradkowski, tackle Jeremy Trueblood, and guard Davin Joseph.

The Bucs started off the season 0–3, with Simms throwing one touchdown to 7 interceptions. In the third game of the season, a last-minute loss to the Panthers, Simms's spleen was ruptured, and he was placed on injured reserve for the balance of the season. After their bye week, the Bucs elected to start Gradkowski, a sixth-round pick from Toledo. After nearly beating the Saints, Gradkowski led the team to last-minute wins over the Cincinnati Bengals and Philadelphia Eagles. The success was short-lived, however, and the Bucs lost five of the next six games. Tim Rattay replaced Gradkowski as quarterback late in the season, and the team finished 4–12. The aged defense, with 5 starters who had played there for a decade or more, was ranked 17th overall, the first time a Tampa defense was not ranked in the top ten since 1996.

After the disappointing 2006 season, the Buccaneers for the first time in several seasons had money to spend in free agency. They brought in quarterback Jeff Garcia, offensive tackle Luke Petitgout, defensive end Kevin Carter, and linebacker Cato June. On April 28, 2007, the Buccaneers drafted Clemson defensive end Gaines Adams with the 4th overall pick in the NFL Draft. After the draft the Buccaneers picked up tight end Jerramy Stevens. and defensive tackle Ryan Sims.

The off-season changes resulted in the Buccaneers winning the NFC South title in the 2007 season, finishing with a 9–7 record, and the 4th seed in the conference. The division crown was the second one in three seasons under Gruden. In the Wild Card round of the playoffs held on January 6, 2008, the Buccaneers lost to the eventual Super Bowl champion Giants by a final score of 24–14.

During the 2008 offseason, the Bucs re-signed head coach Gruden and general manager Allen through the 2011 season. They also acquired former players Warrick Dunn, who had spent the last 6 seasons with the Falcons, and Brian Griese, who was the starting quarterback for the team in 2005 until a knee injury sidelined him for the remainder of the year. Chris Simms was finally released, having not played in a game since his injury in 2006. The Bucs got off to a great start in 2008, with a 9–3 record going into the final month of the season, tied for first place in the division, with a chance at the top seed in the conference. On December 2, it was announced that defensive coordinator Monte Kiffin would be leaving the team after the season's end, for the same job at the University of Tennessee, serving under his son Lane Kiffin, who had just been named the new head coach at the school. After the announcement, the Buccaneers would lose their final four games of the season to finish 9–7 for the second consecutive season. Unlike 2007, it was not enough to secure the division championship, nor a playoff appearance.

Raheem Morris was named the replacement for Monte Kiffin as defensive coordinator in December 2008. A month later, after the huge collapse that ended the 2008 season, the Buccaneers fired Jon Gruden and swiftly elevated Morris to the head coach position. Bruce Allen was also let go, with Mark Dominik named his successor as general manager. Several veterans were released including Derrick Brooks, Joey Galloway, and Jeff Garcia. The new staff traded for tight end Kellen Winslow Jr., signed quarterback Byron Leftwich, and drafted Josh Freeman with the 17th overall pick.

The 2009 squad started out 0–7, behind Leftwich and later Josh Johnson. Following their bye week, the team elevated Freeman to starting quarterback, resulting in the team's first win of the season. The team finished 3–13, the worst record since 1991.

The Bucs' 2010 season surprised many, producing the greatest single-season turnaround in franchise history, going 10–6. This was largely behind the stellar performances of Freeman, rookie receiver Mike Williams, and LeGarrette Blount. Despite the effort, the team narrowly missed the playoffs, losing out on the wild card tiebreaker to the eventual Super Bowl XLV champion Green Bay Packers.

Tampa Bay began the 2011 season with high hopes, adding several key defensive players through the draft. After a 4–2 start, however, the Buccaneers collapsed, dropping ten consecutive games to finish 4–12. The day after a 45–24 loss to the Falcons in their final game of the season, the team fired Morris, offensive coordinator Greg Olson and the rest of his corresponding staff. During the Morris era, the lack of on-the-field success, along with several contributing factors, including the recession, saw attendance slip, precipitating local television blackouts for the first time since the mid-1990s. All eight regular-season home games were blacked out in 2010, and 5 of 7 were blacked out in 2011 (one "home" game was played in London).
About three weeks after firing Raheem Morris, the Buccaneers hired Greg Schiano from Rutgers as the new head coach. During his introductory conference he stated "There will be Buccaneer men, and there will be a Buccaneer Way." The phrase "The Buccaneer Way" became a slogan among fans and local media, describing the new regime and attitude. The team filled out the coaching staff with new faces, including Mike Sullivan, Bill Sheridan, and Butch Davis. In 2013, Dave Wannstedt was also added as special teams coach. In the first day of free agency, the club signed top prospects Vincent Jackson and Carl Nicks, as well as Eric Wright. The $140 million committed to the team during that 24-hour period is the largest investment the Glazer family has put into the team going back almost a decade.

The team finished the 2012 season at 7–9, notably ranking first in rushing defense. Furthermore, the rushing offense was highlighted by the breakout performance of Doug Martin. After two seasons of game-day local television blackouts, the improved team began seeing increased attendance and attention, and some blackouts lifted. 6 games were blacked out in 2012. For the three-year period of 2010–2012, the Bucs led the NFL in local television blackouts with 19 (Cincinnati was second with 11). Schiano's strict and regimented coaching style, however, drew criticism at the end of a game against the Giants, ordering his defense to continue to aggressively tackle the offense as Giants quarterback Eli Manning was taking a knee to end the game. Afterwards, Schiano was met at midfield by an irate Tom Coughlin, who did not appreciate the Bucs' aggressiveness.

Coming into the 2013 season, fans and analysts had better than average expectations for Tampa Bay. They were expected to improve their record, and potentially make a playoffs run. The predictions proved unfounded, as numerous issues on and off the field saw the team collapse. The team dealt with several players, including Lawrence Tynes, Carl Nicks, and Johnthan Banks, contracting antibiotic-resistant MRSA infections, which led to a 2015 lawsuit by Tynes that settled in 2017. During training camp, a reported rift began to divide Schiano and quarterback Josh Freeman. After an 0–3 start, Freeman was benched, and ultimately released. This was after Freeman reportedly missed several team meetings, along with the team's annual photograph. Schiano started rookie Mike Glennon, but the team continued to lose. The fans' confidence of Schiano began to decay rapidly, and after a 0–8 start, the team got its first win of the season on a Monday night against Miami. A brief win streak saw improvements with Glennon at quarterback, and Bobby Rainey took over at running back with stellar numbers after Doug Martin went down with a shoulder injury.  There were no blackouts in 2013, as the Glazers bought up the necessary tickets for two of the games to get to the 85% threshold needed to prevent local blackouts.

Despite some individual improvements, and some impressive performances by members of the defense, the team dropped the last three games of the season, and finished 4–12. The team ranked last or near the bottom in almost every offensive category. On December 30, 2013, Schiano and general manager Mark Dominik were fired.

On January 1, 2014, Lovie Smith was hired as the new head coach of the Buccaneers, replacing Greg Schiano. Smith had previously spent 5 seasons with the Buccaneers from 1996 to 2001 coaching the linebackers under Tony Dungy. During his first news conference with the Bucs, Smith talked about restoring the quality of the team from the late 1990s and early 2000s: "There was a certain brand of football you expected from us," Smith said. "You know we would be relentless. There was a brand of football that you got from us each week at Raymond James Stadium. It was hard for opponents to come in and win. We have gotten away from that a little bit, and it's time ... for us to become a relevant team again."

On January 21, 2014, Jason Licht was hired as the new general manager, replacing Mark Dominik. He was officially introduced at One Buc Place on January 23, 2014. In his first news conference, Licht talked about his philosophy: "Our philosophy is going to be to build through the draft. That's where we find our stars. That's where we find the next generation. But also in the short term and long term we're going to supplement our roster through free agency but we're going to look for value. We're going to spend wisely."

After signing veteran free agent Josh McCown and many more free agents, many analysts predicted that the Buccaneers could be the surprise team of the year and possibly make a playoff run. Those predictions soon went away after the Bucs began the season 0–3, including a 56–14 blowout against the Falcons on Thursday Night Football. McCown was injured in that game, and second-year quarterback Mike Glennon was named the starter. His first start of the 2014 season ended with the Bucs earning their first victory of the season in Pittsburgh against the Steelers 27–24. The Bucs lost the next 4 games, including two overtime losses against the Saints and the Vikings, one blowout against the Ravens, and a 5-point loss against the Cleveland Browns. Going into week 10 at 1–8, McCown returned as the starter. Mathematically, the Bucs were still in playoff contention only being 3 games out of first place in the division. McCown's first game back ended with a 27–17 loss to the Falcons but won the following week in a 27–7 blowout against struggling Washington. The Bucs would lose the next three games and were officially knocked out of playoff contention in week 14. The Bucs finished 2–14, winning 2 fewer games than the previous season and secured the first-overall draft pick for the 2015 NFL draft.

Despite the team's record, first-round draft pick wide receiver Mike Evans had more than 1,000 receiving yards, and he became the youngest NFL player to record more than 200 receiving yards in a single game. Vincent Jackson also had more than 1,000 yards receiving, which represented Tampa Bay's first pair of 1,000 yard receivers in a season. Second-year CB Johnthan Banks led the team with 4 interceptions and has 50 tackles. Danny Lansanah flourished in the Tampa 2 system with 81 tackles, 1.5 QB sacks, and 3 interceptions, with 2 of those interceptions returned for touchdowns for the 2014 season. Jacquies Smith, who was signed from Buffalo after waiving rookie DE Scott Solomon a month into the season, had 17 combined tackles, 13 solo tackles, 6.5 sacks, and 1 forced fumble in only 8 starts for 2014.

In December 2014, a report surfaced that the Buccaneers used homeless people to sell beer and did not pay them.

After the conclusion of the 2014 season, Tampa Bay hired Ben Steele to become the team's new offensive quality control coach as well as former Falcons offensive coordinator Dirk Koetter to be their new offensive coordinator after parting ways with QB coach and interim offensive coordinator Marcus Arroyo. Having a 2–14 record, tied for the worst record in the NFL in 2014, Tampa Bay gained the first-overall pick in the 2015 NFL draft. They also made some headlines when they released quarterback Josh McCown on February 11, 2015, to save $5.25 million in cap space. With the first overall pick in the NFL draft, the Buccaneers selected Jameis Winston from Florida State. Throughout the off-season, there was much debate whether the Buccaneers should pick Winston or Oregon quarterback Marcus Mariota.

On January 6, 2016, Smith was fired by the Buccaneers after posting a record of 8–24 in his two seasons, including a 6–10 record in the 2015 season.

On January 15, 2016, Dirk Koetter was promoted from offensive coordinator to become the new head coach of the Tampa Bay Buccaneers.

The teams' record sat at 3–5 following a blowout loss to the Falcons in a nationally televised Thursday Night Football matchup. Playoff chances grew increasingly more unlikely. However, following the loss, the Buccaneers rattled off five straight victories, the longest winning streak since the 2002 season. During the streak, the Buccaneers earned upset victories over the heavily favored Chiefs and Seahawks. The Buccaneers ended their 2016 season with a 9–7 record, but lost the NFC's sixth seed to the Lions due to tiebreakers.

On March 9, 2017, the Buccaneers signed former Washington Redskins wide receiver DeSean Jackson, defensive tackle Chris Baker, former Cowboys safety J. J. Wilcox (traded to Pittsburgh Steelers), former New York Jets kicker Nick Folk, and veteran quarterback Ryan Fitzpatrick.

They were hampered with poor performance and an early kicking situation, as they failed to improve or match their 9–7 record from the previous season. After a loss to the Lions, they were mathematically eliminated from the playoffs with a 4–9 record. The Bucs finished the season 5–11. This was their tenth consecutive season without a playoff appearance, with their last being in the 2007 season. Also, the Bucs finished last in the NFC South for the seventh time in nine seasons.

The Bucs began the 2018 season 2–0 for the first time since the 2010 season. Journeyman quarterback Ryan Fitzpatrick started the first two games after Jameis Winston was suspended during the off-season for the first three games. Fitzpatrick threw for over 400 yards and 4 touchdowns in the two-game winning streak, coming against the Saints (the eventual NFC South winner) and the Eagles (the defending Super Bowl champions). Fitzpatrick would continue the success in week 3's Monday night game against the Steelers, throwing for another 400 yards and becoming the first player in NFL history to throw for 400 or more yards in three consecutive games. After Winston's suspension was up following the Monday Night game, Fitzpatrick remained the starter for week 4's matchup against the Bears. Fitzpatrick struggled and was benched after halftime for Winston. Winston returned as the starter in week 6. Despite the quarterback controversy, the Bucs had a top 3 offense, averaging 27.8 points during the first six games. However, their defense continued to struggle. After week 6's loss to the Falcons, defensive coordinator Mike Smith was fired and linebackers coach Mark Duffner was named the interim defensive coordinator. After a close overtime win against the Browns, Winston threw four interceptions against the Bengals the following week. After returning from suspension, Winston threw at least two interceptions per game, and due to that, Fitzpatrick was once again named the starter in week 9. Fitzpatrick, again, struggled, and Winston was renamed the starter for week 12's game against the 49ers. Winston improved, and the team won two straight. However, they dropped their last four games. After a second consecutive last-place season where the team finished with a 5–11 record, Koetter was fired.

Bruce Arians years (2019–2021) 

Following the termination of Dirk Koetter, the Buccaneers named Bruce Arians as the 12th head coach in franchise history on January 8, 2019. Arians had been retired from coaching for a year, having spent the 2018 season in the broadcast booth. Because Arians was still under contract with the Arizona Cardinals through the end of the 2019 season, Tampa Bay agreed to give the Cardinals a sixth-round pick in the 2019 NFL Draft for the rights to Arians, as well as receiving Arizona's seventh-round pick in the same draft. On the same day it was reported the Bucs would also bring Byron Leftwich, who had served under Arians in Arizona, as offensive coordinator. The next day the Buccaneers announced the hiring of former Jets head coach Todd Bowles as defensive coordinator.

In the 2019 season, the Bucs finished with a 7–9 record. Jameis Winston set a franchise record with 5,109 passing yards, becoming the eighth player in NFL history to eclipse 5,000 yards. He also set a franchise record with 33 touchdown passes, however in throwing 30 interceptions, he became the first quarterback in league history to have at least thirty of each. He would not be re-signed by Tampa Bay after the season.

Super Bowl LV champions (2020) 
The Buccaneers made arguably the biggest acquisition of the 2020 offseason when they acquired veteran quarterback Tom Brady, widely considered the greatest to ever play the position. The offensive engine of the New England Patriots' sports dynasty from 2001 to 2019, Brady announced that he would not be re-signing with the Patriots after 20 seasons and joined the Buccaneers for 2020.

Later in the offseason, tight end and Brady's New England teammate Rob Gronkowski announced that he was coming out of retirement to return to the NFL. On the same day, the Patriots made an agreement to trade Gronkowski to the Buccaneers, along with a seventh-round pick in exchange for a compensatory fourth-round pick in the 2020 NFL Draft. Gronkowski would finish the regular season with 45 receptions, 623 receiving yards, and 7 receiving touchdowns in 16 games.

On September 6, 2020, the Buccaneers signed running back Leonard Fournette, who had been waived the week prior by the Jacksonville Jaguars.

On October 27, 2020, free agent wide receiver Antonio Brown signed a one-year contract with the Buccaneers. The move reunited Brown with Arians, who was his first offensive coordinator on the Pittsburgh Steelers, and Brady, whom he played one game alongside of for the Patriots. Brown made his first appearance with the Bucs in week 9 and would finish the regular season with 45 receptions, 483 receiving yards, and 4 receiving touchdowns in eight games.

In Week 15, the Buccaneers overcame a 17–0 deficit against the Atlanta Falcons, to win 31–27 at Mercedes-Benz Stadium in Atlanta, Georgia.

In the 2020 season, Tampa Bay clinched their first playoff berth since 2007 after a 47–7 victory against the Lions in Week 16. By the end of the 2020 regular season, Brady had set the Buccaneers record for passing touchdowns with 40. In the same game, receiver Mike Evans set the NFL record for consecutive 1,000-yard seasons to start a career with 7 straight 1,000 yard seasons.

In the playoffs, the Buccaneers defeated the Washington Football Team 31–23 in the wild card round, their first postseason victory since winning Super Bowl XXXVII in 2002. In the divisional round, they defeated the Saints 30–20 to advance to the NFC Championship Game for the fourth time in franchise history, and first since the 2002 season. They then defeated the Packers to advance to Super Bowl LV for the franchise's second appearance in the league championship, facing the defending Super Bowl champions, the Kansas City Chiefs. The Bucs defeated the Chiefs to win their second Super Bowl title by a score of 31–9. Coincidentally, Raymond James Stadium was named as the host stadium of Super Bowl LV in 2017 when it was determined that SoFi Stadium, which had been awarded the game the year before its construction had begun, would not be completed in time to be eligible under league requirements to host. Thus, the Buccaneers became the first team in NFL history to play in and win a Super Bowl that was held at its home stadium.

In the 2021 offseason, the Buccaneers re-signed all 22 of their starters from the 2020 Super Bowl championship season, in addition to re-signing Fournette and former Bengals running back Giovani Bernard. The Buccaneers are the first team in the salary cap era (1994), and fourth team all-time, to re-sign all 22 starters from their Super Bowl team, while every other team's roster changed.

After the 2021 regular season, in which they posted a 13-4 record and secured the #2 seed in the NFC playoffs, the Buccaneers' title defense came to an end with a 30–27 last-second loss to the eventual Super Bowl champion Los Angeles Rams in the Divisional Round.

Todd Bowles years (2022–present) 
On March 30, 2022, head coach Bruce Arians suddenly resigned, with defensive coordinator Todd Bowles being named the immediate replacement.

Defense

Throughout their history, the Buccaneers have been known for their suffocating defense. It started with the drafting of Hall of Fame defensive end Lee Roy Selmon with their first pick ever in 1976. Three Buccaneer players have been named the AP Defensive Player of the Year, and the team has led the league in total defense on three occasions, including the 2002 championship season. The team's defense was instrumental in their 2020 playoff run which led to their second Super Bowl title. All five of the Buccaneers Hall of Fame inductees are defensive players or coaches.

1978–1982
Led by Selmon, Linebackers Dewey Selmon, Richard Wood, Dave Lewis, and Mike Washington, Mark Cotney, and Cedric Brown in the secondary, the early years Buccaneers quickly earned an identity as a defensive team. Their 3–4 defense peaked in 1979 when they led the league in total defense, points allowed, and first downs allowed. Lee Roy Selmon was voted NFL Defensive Player of the Year, but they eventually fell 10 points short of the Super Bowl as the offense held them back in the NFC Championship game in a 9–0 loss to the Los Angeles Rams. Although 1980 was a down year, the unit made pass defense adjustments and returned in 1981 to finish No.1 in Touchdowns allowed; giving up only 10 TD's all season.

1997–2008: The Tampa 2
The team drafted franchise cornerstones John Lynch in 1993, and Warren Sapp and Derrick Brooks in 1995 to go along with All-Pro linebacker Hardy Nickerson. That was followed by the hiring of innovative defensive coordinator Monte Kiffin in 1996. The new-look Buccaneers set the stage for one of the greatest defensive runs in NFL history. From 1997 to 2008, the Buccaneers defense finished in the league's top ten every year but one, including eight top-5 finishes, and two top-ranked efforts. Kiffin along with head coach Tony Dungy created the "Tampa 2" defense, a modified version of the established Cover 2 scheme.

Kiffin's defenses were known as gang tacklers with tremendous team speed with a front four that could pressure the quarterback consistently, fast sideline-to-sideline linebackers, and a hard-hitting secondary that caused turnovers. Many teams have copied the Tampa 2, but none have come close to the success the Buccaneers experienced led by numerous Pro Bowlers and Hall of Famers. The Tampa Bay defense featured future Hall of Famers, Derrick Brooks, John Lynch, and Warren Sapp, and Pro Bowlers, Ronde Barber, Hardy Nickerson, Simeon Rice, Shelton Quarles, Donnie Abraham, and Super Bowl XXXVII MVP Dexter Jackson. Sapp and Nickerson were named to the 1990s All-Decade 2nd Team while the 2000s All-Decade Team featured Sapp and Brooks as 1st Team players and Ronde Barber on the 2nd Team.

2002 defense

The 2002 Buccaneers defense is widely regarded as one of the greatest defenses in NFL history, rivaled only by the 1976 Steelers, 1985 Bears, 1986 Giants, 2000 Ravens, 2013 Seahawks, and 2015 Broncos. In the regular season, Tampa Bay led the league in total defense (252.8 ypg), points allowed (196), first downs allowed (14.8 pg), passing (155.6 ypg), interceptions (31), interceptions returned for touchdowns (5), opponent passer rating (48.4), and shutouts (2). They also finished third in opponent rushing average (3.8 ypc), and sixth in sacks (43). Derrick Brooks was awarded AP Defensive Player of the Year as the defense led the way to a 12–4 regular season. The team was even better in the postseason allowing only 37 points in three games combined – all against top ten offenses. In those three playoff games, they intercepted 9 passes – returning 4 for touchdowns – and collected 11 sacks.

In Super Bowl XXXVII, the Buccaneers delivered one of the most impressive defensive performances in Super Bowl history. Playing against the #1 offense in the league led by league MVP Rich Gannon, the defense actually outscored the Raiders offense, allowing 2 offensive touchdowns while returning 3 interceptions for touchdowns. The defense set two records in the 48–21 blowout, one for most interceptions in a Super Bowl (5), and one for most interceptions returned for touchdowns in a Super Bowl (3). Defensive back Dwight Smith became the only player in Super Bowl history to record multiple interceptions returned for touchdowns in a Super Bowl, while fellow defensive back Dexter Jackson was awarded Super Bowl MVP for his two interceptions in the game. In 19 total games in 2002, the Buccaneers recorded 40 interceptions, 53 sacks, and 9 defensive touchdowns.

2019–present: Todd Bowles' 3–4 defense
When Arians was hired by the Bucs, he appointed former New York Jets head coach Todd Bowles to be the team's defensive coordinator. That same offseason, the team drafted linebacker Devin White with the fifth overall pick in the 2019 NFL Draft, after signing outside linebacker Shaquil Barrett to a one-year, $4 million contract, and defensive lineman Ndamukong Suh for one year, $10 million. With these acquisitions, along with linebackers Lavonte David, Carl Nassib, Jason Pierre-Paul, and defensive linemen Vita Vea, Beau Allen and William Gholston, Bowles implemented the 3–4 defensive scheme, with a heavy emphasis on blitzing. David and White were the teams' leaders, Barrett led the team, and the league, in sacks with 19.5, and the 2019 Buccaneers finished No. 1 in the league in run defense. The team's defense improved next season after Suh, Barrett, and Pierre-Paul were re-signed and Antoine Winfield Jr. was drafted in the second round of the 2020 NFL Draft. The Buccaneers defense was a massive part of the teams' turn-around in 2020, finishing 1st in run defense, 7th in pass defense and 8th in total defense. The Buccaneers pass defense improved 29th to 7th, thanks in part to their young secondary, led by Carlton Davis, Sean Murphy-Bunting, Jordan Whitehead, Winfield Jr., Ross Cockrell, Herb Miller and Mike Edwards. Nicknamed, the "Grave Diggers", they forced two interceptions, including a pick-six by Jamel Dean, four sacks and gave up no touchdowns against 2020 NFL MVP Aaron Rodgers in Week 6, forced three interceptions and a 32.3 QBR against future Hall-of-Famer Drew Brees, and five sacks and another interception against Rodgers in the NFC Championship Game. In Super Bowl LV, against the league's No. 1 offense led by 2018 NFL MVP Patrick Mahomes, the Buccaneers held Kansas City to season lows in points and red zone attempts, with 9 points, all from field goals, 22 first downs, and 0–3 red zone attempts. They forced two interceptions, three sacks, 29 pressures, and five QB hits, and a 49.9 QB rating during the game.  In 19 total games in 2020, the Buccaneers recorded 18 interceptions, 58 sacks, 19 forced fumbles, and 12 fumble recoveries.

Facilities

Since 1998, the Buccaneers have played their home games at Raymond James Stadium in Tampa. Prior to that, they had played in Tampa Stadium since their establishment.

In 1975, the Buccaneers built a small practice complex with offices near Tampa International Airport called One Buccaneer Place – often shorted to "One Buc Place". The team utilized the unspectacular facility through the 1990s and into the early 2000s. It sat across the street from International Plaza and Bay Street, and backed up to the runways of the airport. It was located about two miles away from Tampa Stadium. As other NFL clubs began replacing and upgrading their respective facilities, Buccaneers players and coaches stepped up their complaints about the constant aircraft noise, cramped offices, small locker rooms, infestations, and decrepit condition of One Buc Place. Then-head coach Jon Gruden sarcastically referred to the facility as "The Woodshed"; some of the coaches' offices were actually converted broom closets. The frequent summertime rain sent the team to practice in a nearby parking garage. Some players and staff even claim to have come down with illnesses from spending too much time in the building. For much of the team's existence, the Buccaneers held training camp on the University of Tampa campus, then at the expansive and better-equipped Disney's Wide World of Sports Complex near Orlando (2002–2008).

In August 2006, the Buccaneers unveiled a new $30 million training facility. Its features include offices and meeting rooms, three natural grass practice fields, a theater for meetings and press conferences, an expanded weight room, a fully equipped kitchen and dining room, a rehabilitation center with three separate pools and a locker room twice the size of the former location. The building is capped off with a five-story glass and steel football as a key design element. An adjacent climate-controlled indoor practice facility, featuring an artificial turf field, was later completed in 2017. In 2009, the team began holding training camp at this new complex.

In the second week of September 2007, statues of important figures from the Buccaneers 2002 championship season were moved into the lobby area in an exhibit called "Moment of Victory". The life-size statues included players Mike Alstott, Ronde Barber, Derrick Brooks, Brad Johnson, John Lynch, Shelton Quarles, Simeon Rice, Warren Sapp, and head coach Jon Gruden. The statues are modeled after images from the sideline towards the end of Super Bowl XXXVII.

Initially, the facility might have been unnamed, but for over a decade, it simply was referred to as "One Buc Place", utilizing the same name as the old building. In 2018, the facility was officially named Advent Health Training Facility, as part of a ten-year naming rights deal with Advent Health.

Logos and uniforms

Logos
Since 1976, the Buccaneers have changed the team's primary logo five times; however, most of the changes have been relatively minor. The original logo the team wore for the first twenty years of the franchise's history was the most unique; both the color and design differed from what the team has worn since. There are two similar versions of the original logo that had a slight change for the 1992 season until 1996 when the red and pewter uniforms were revealed. The latter of the orange logos is often mistaken for being used during the entire "creamsicle" era, but was only worn during the final five seasons of this look. The most obvious difference between them are the design of the face, specifically the open eye, the design on the dagger, and the usage of white near the neck of the first design. The team used the original orange logo from 1976 through 1991 for their throwback games. From 1997 onwards, the Buccaneers' logo has gone through three iterations. The second edition of the team's logo is smaller and has a slightly different design to the skull and sword compared to the later designs. The two most recent designs are the most comparable, despite the red being a slightly different tint. Each version of the logo has changed with the team's overall uniform design.

1976–1996

Shortly after the franchise was awarded, in February 1975 the team name of "Buccaneers" was selected, along with proposed team colors of green, orange and white. The name was said to be reminiscent of José Gaspar and the Buccaneers of the Caribbean Sea, and the color orange representing the Florida citrus industry. Almost immediately, the nickname "Bucs" became popular, but the alternative "Bay Bucs" failed to gain traction.

A few months later, however, green was dropped from the color scheme. The artists' renditions were too similar to the aqua used by the Miami Dolphins, as well as the green shades utilized by the Miami Hurricanes and Florida A&M. While they desired to keep the primary color orange, which provided a popular visual link to the Gators, Hurricanes, and Florida A&M, they sought to further distinguish themselves. The color red as an accent color was substituted, as a gesture to the former Tampa Spartans and loosely, to the Florida State Seminoles. The orange/red/white combination was now a composite of all major college teams in the state at the time.

Home uniforms originally included orange jerseys with white numerals outlined in red. These are the now-infamous "Creamsicle uniforms", so named from the perceived similarity of the uniform's color to the popular ice cream snack. Road white jerseys had orange numerals outlined in red for 1976, but those colors were reversed for 1977 and beyond. The color swap provided better visibility, especially for television coverage purposes. Officially speaking, the club's colors during this time period were Florida orange, red, and white.

Long-time Tampa Tribune cartoonist and Ye Mystic Krewe of Gasparilla member Lamar Sparkman designed the first team logo. Faced with the challenge of designing a logo that did not closely resemble that of the other "pirates" in the league, the Raiders, Sparkman came up with a moustached pirate wearing a plumed slouch hat, with a large hoop earring in his left ear and clutching a dagger in his teeth. The pirate appeared to be winking. Sparkman decided to portray the character not as a "hairy-legged slob", but more of gallant, swashbuckling, and rakish, "classy" type. The eye wink was used rather than an eyepatch, since the Raiders' logo already depicted a patch over one eye. For a very brief time he was referred to as "Morgan", and coach John McKay called him "Errol Flynn". Local St. Petersburg Times sportswriter Hubert Mizell coined the somewhat belittling nickname "Bucco Bruce" in a February 1976 column, noting almost immediately the mascot's unintimidating and "cavalier" appearance. The nickname stuck, while the logo and the name "Bucco Bruce" became symbols and reminders of the club's ongoing futility. Sports writer and commentator Nick Bakay once said that Bucco Bruce was a pirate who "struck fear in the hearts of no one". In 1992, the Bucco Bruce logo was given a minor facelift, as part of an overall uniform refresh. It resulted in a crisper and larger version, and was used for five seasons.

Beloit College, located in Beloit, Wisconsin, received a notice from the Tampa Bay Buccaneers of the college's illegitimate use of their mascot. Beloit College's buccaneer is the mirror image of the Tampa Bay buccaneer, with the creamsicle colors replaced with Beloit's school colors. Athletic Director Ed DeGeorge said Beloit's Buccaneers have used the logo since the early 1980s, when he chose it from a book while ordering decals for the football team's helmets. The NFL's Buccaneers joined the league in 1976. However, the Buccaneers withdrew their claim against Beloit College because of the independent decision to redesign the logo.

During their first season in 1976, the Buccaneers wore white jerseys (with orange numerals) and white pants (with striped socks) for all 14 regular season games. Orange jerseys with white pants (and striped socks) were utilized only for 1976 preseason games. After the 1976 season, the team would not see striped socks again until they began wearing them as throwback uniforms starting in 2009. This would also be the final time orange numbers would be worn by the franchise, as red numbers would be used instead on white jerseys. Apart from some minor changes to the stripes throughout the next twenty years, the orange editions of the Buccaneers uniforms would only see four major versions.

In 1992, the Buccaneers introduced orange pants to be worn with the white jerseys. This would also result in the next major change to the white uniforms, as the white uniforms would no longer be worn with white pants and would also introduce orange collars to replace white ones. After 1992, white pants were used for a final time in 1994 for a single game, and this would also be the only time that the white jerseys with orange collars were worn with white pants in a regular-season game. Prior to the team's season finale in 1995 against the Lions, coach Sam Wyche suggested that the Buccaneers wear the orange pants with their orange jerseys. The idea was vetoed by, among others, Pro Bowl linebacker Hardy Nickerson.

During the 1985 season, the team wore a special patch marking their tenth season. For the 1993 season, the Buccaneers added a commemorative patch to the right sleeve of their uniforms, which read "Mr C" in cursive script. It was in recognition of owner Hugh Culverhouse, who was battling terminal lung cancer.

1997–2013

For the  season, the Buccaneers worked with the NFL to develop a more marketable and intimidating look in order to improve the team's image. The Buccaneers changed their primary team colors to red and pewter, with black and orange as accents. The "Bucco Bruce" logo was replaced by a red wind-swept flag displaying a white pirate skull and crossed sabres which is a modified Jolly Roger (similar to that of Calico Jack). The flagpole was another larger sabre. The "Buccaneers" team name was written in a new font, Totally Gothic, and was either red with shadows of pewter or red and white. Orange pinstriping, and an orange football, was used to maintain a visual link to the former colors. Chris Berman nicknamed them "the pirates in pewter pants," a play on the Gilbert and Sullivan opera The Pirates of Penzance. The nickname "Pewter Pirates" also became trendy. The Buccaneers staged a ceremony at The Pier on April 7, 1997, in which Bucco Bruce walked the plank of the pirate ship Bounty docked in Tampa Bay. But not before he was pardoned at the last minute by Governor Lawton Chiles.

The new uniforms were adopted while Raymond James Stadium was still under construction, and the new colors would be prominent at the new facility. This new color scheme loosely resembled that of the Tampa Bay Bandits, the USFL team that played in the region during their three-season existence from 1983 to 1985. That team had a color scheme of red, silver, black, and white.

The new uniforms provided a combination of either red or white jerseys with either pewter or white trousers. The white-on-white combination has been used numerous times during the preseason and for early regular season games. The red-on-white combination has been used sparingly, for some prime time home games and/or special occasions. Most games, home and away, have utilized pewter trousers.

For 2005, the uniform featured a patch commemorating the club's 30th season. In 2014, a circular patch was worn with the initials "MG", after the death of owner Malcolm Glazer. For 2015, a patch commemorating the club's 40th season was worn.

Like many other NFL teams located in subtropical climates, the Buccaneers customarily wear their white road jerseys at home during the first half of the season – forcing opponents to wear their darker colors during the hot summers and autumns in Tampa. Additionally, the visitors' bench of Raymond James Stadium is located on the east side of the stadium, which is in direct sunlight for games that kick off at 1:00 p.m. Eastern, whereas the west (home) sideline is in the shade. In , the Buccaneers started to wear white at home to accommodate Vinny Testaverde's color blindness. Vinny Testaverde had bad performances in the darker (orange) uniforms and persuaded head coach Ray Perkins to change the team's home uniform to white. In certain years, such as 1989, 1990, 1991, and 1996 – the last year of the original uniforms, the Buccaneers generally wore white at home for the entire season including preseason. Since the new uniforms were adopted, the Buccaneers typically wear their red jerseys for home games during the second half of the season, and for most nighttime home games. They have also worn red jerseys all four times as the home team in International Series games. During the preseason, the Buccaneers usually wear white for their home games. Since the 1997 season, the Buccaneers have worn both their red jerseys (4 times) and white jerseys (2 times) for home postseason games. At Super Bowl XXXVII, in which Tampa Bay was the designated home team, they elected to wear their red home jerseys.

The Buccaneers' 1997 uniform change prompted a 2003 lawsuit by the Raiders, who claimed that the NFL and the Buccaneers had infringed upon key trademark elements of the Raiders' brand, including the Raiders' pirate logo. In the same suit, the Raiders challenged the Carolina Panthers' color scheme, which included silver and black. The Raiders wanted the courts to bar the Buccaneers and Panthers from wearing their uniforms while playing in California. However, since the lawsuit was filed in a California state court, the lawsuit was tossed out because only federal courts have jurisdiction on intellectual property issues.

2014–2019

The Buccaneers unveiled a slightly altered logo and helmet on February 20, 2014. On March 3, 2014, they unveiled the entire new uniform to be used starting in the 2014 season. The jersey numbers featured a high-vis reflective outline, the helmet logo was revamped and enlarged, and the facemask had a chrome-effect coating. The Bucs' original Creamsicle shade of orange was reintroduced as accent trim. The reaction to the newer uniforms was mixed. Of note, the jersey numbers were derisively compared to digital alarm clock numerals. Different color sock combinations were used with white and colored uniforms, almost always being pewter or red; however, there were two occasions in 2014 when orange socks were used for two different weeks.

In 2015, the Buccaneers debuted a Color Rush uniform featuring red jerseys and red trousers, with pewter numerals.

2020–present
The Buccaneers unveiled three  designs on April 7, 2020. The new uniform designs evoke the club's 1997–2013 design, while incorporating modern design elements from the 2014 uniform refresh, including the enlarged flag-and-crossed-swords logo, as well as the modern ship design logo on the sleeves. While the Buccaneers kept the regular red and white uniforms with either white or pewter pants, they also released an all-pewter alternate ("Color Rush") uniform for the first time.

For Super Bowl LV held at Raymond James Stadium, Tampa Bay was the designated home team, the first team in NFL history to play in a Super Bowl in their own stadium. They elected to wear their road white jerseys with pewter trousers, instead of their red jerseys, citing the success they had enjoyed during the season in that combination. Tampa Bay routed Kansas City 31–9, giving them a Super Bowl win in both their red jerseys (XXXVII) and their white jerseys (LV).

During the 2020 season, the Buccaneers finished with a 6–0 record wearing their newer white jersey/pewter pants combination, including three postseason victories over New Orleans, Green Bay, and Kansas City, respectively. They were first introduced in their Week 6 game against Green Bay, a 38–10 win at Raymond James Stadium. A renewed interest in wearing white jerseys at home saw Tampa Bay schedule six of eight 2021 home games with white (up from the typical four), plus home playoff games in the Wild Card and Divisional rounds with white/pewter as well.

Throwback uniform
Following their uniform change in 1997, the Buccaneers did not wear the old orange uniforms, even during popular league-sponsored "throwback" weekends. The old uniforms were mostly eschewed by the club, and the sale of team merchandise in the old color scheme was embargoed for several years. Fans' opinions of the old uniforms were equally as negative. However, after over a decade, there was a renewed interest in the old uniforms, as throwbacks and other alternate uniforms across the league were becoming increasingly popular. In 2008, the team revealed that they would be wearing orange throwback uniforms for one game in the 2009 season. Their use was in conjunction with the creation of a Buccaneers Ring of Honor, celebrating the 30th anniversary of the 1979 division championship team.

Throwback merchandise went on sale in the summer of 2009, and referred to the orange color not as "Florida Orange", but as "Orange Glaze". Considerable research was done using photographs and old uniforms to match the original color schemes. The dagger-biting pirate was given a cleaned-up look, and the orange, red, and white uniforms debuted against the Packers (Tampa Bay's former division rival) on November 8, 2009. Raymond James Stadium was also transformed via orange banners and classic field logos and fonts back to the classic Tampa Stadium look of the late 1970s. The Buccaneers won their first throwback game behind rookie quarterback Josh Freeman's first-career NFL start. The throwback game was to become an annual tradition, but went on hiatus after 2012 due to league-wide safety restrictions requiring players wear the same helmet throughout the season. After changes in league policies, the throwback uniforms are scheduled to return in 2023. The Buccaneers are 1–3 in throwback games.

Seasons, facts and records

Records

It is now seventh—the NFL record is 66 yards (held by Justin Tucker, of the Baltimore Ravens).
 The Buccaneers are the first post-merger expansion team to win a division title, win a playoff game, and to host and play in a conference championship game. This was accomplished during the 1979 season.
 They are the first team since the merger to complete a winning season when starting 10 or more rookies, which happened in the 2010 season.
 Until December 16, 2007, the Buccaneers were the only NFL team to have never returned a kickoff for a touchdown during the regular season. This distinction ended when Micheal Spurlock returned the 1,865th try 90 yards for the score during the week 15 game against the Atlanta Falcons.
 A record 69 consecutive games with at least one sack. The record (previously 68 by Dallas) was broken on November 9, 2003, against Carolina. The streak ended the following week on November 16, 2003, against Green Bay.
 50 consecutive games with at least one sack and one forced turnover. The streak ended on November 16, 2003, against Green Bay.
 54 consecutive games with at least one forced turnover (interception or forced fumble). The streak ended December 14, 2003, against the Texans. The all-time record was 71 consecutive games by the Eagles.
 They are the first team ever to play in (and win) a Super Bowl held in their home stadium (LV).
 They are the first team since the start of the salary cap era to bring back every free agent starter from their Super Bowl roster.
 Winning 9 consecutive games (including playoffs) while scoring 30 or more points.

Players of note

Current roster

Pro Football Hall of Famers

Retired numbers
Despite not being formally retired, the Buccaneers have not reissued 20 (Ronde Barber), 40 (Mike Alstott), or 47 (John Lynch) since those players retired from playing. Derrick Brooks and Warren Sapp did not have their numbers formally retired until they were named to the Hall of Fame. However, as of 2023, John Lynch has not had his number retired, despite being inducted into the Hall of Fame in 2021, nor has Ronde Barber after being inducted in 2023. Another number that has seen limited usage is 42, worn by the late Ricky Bell. Since Bell's last season in 1981, 42 has only been worn by two players, the most recent being in 1990.

Individual awards

NFL All-Decade and Anniversary Teams
Since Tampa Bay's entrance into the NFL, at least one player has been included on each NFL All-Decade Team, excluding the 1970s which Tampa Bay only had existed for four seasons. Tampa Bay has had players elected to the 1980s, 1990s, 2000s, and 2010s teams. Among the three Anniversary Teams, the franchise did not exist for the 50th Anniversary Team, no players were selected to the 75th Anniversary Team, and five players were selected to the 100th Anniversary Team. Players are only included on lists which they played for the team within the years of the decade; members, such as Tom Brady, did not join the Buccaneers until 2020, despite being a member of the 2000s and 2010s All-Decade Teams.

Tampa Stadium Krewe of Honor
In 1991, the organization initiated the "Krewe of Honor" to recognize top players, and featured a mural of the first class of three members. The display was located on the east side of the stadium, and honorees were presented with a plaque. Quarterback Doug Williams was inducted September 6, 1992, and owner Hugh Culverhouse on September 5, 1993. No additional members were added before Tampa Stadium was closed and demolished; when the stadium was demolished in 1998, so was the Krewe.

Ring of Honor
On November 8, 2009, the team unveiled a new Ring of Honor at Raymond James Stadium. Hall of Fame defensive tackle, as well as the team' first-ever draft pick, Lee Roy Selmon was the first inductee. On October 19, 2008, one year prior to the inception of the Ring of Honor, Mike Alstott was honored by the club following his retirement. He would be formally inducuted into the ring in 2015. Former head coach Jon Gruden was inducted in 2017, but due to controversy surrounding emails he sent while working for ESPN, he was removed in 2021. Due to the COVID-19 pandemic, the induction ceremony for 2020 inductee Monte Kiffin was postponed until 2021. There was no separate 2021 inductee, except that previous inductee John Lynch was honored again for having been subsequently named to the Pro Football Hall of Fame. No others members have required an additional Hall of Fame celebration, as their Ring of Honor ceremonies all came after their respective HOF induction.

As of 2022, all players that had been named to the defunct "Krewe of Honor" have been subsequently inducted into the new Ring of Honor, with the lone exception of Ricky Bell.

The ring initially featured the player's number and last name in protruding, illuminated letters, along the frieze of the stadium's upper deck. When the stadium underwent renovations in 2015–2016, the ring was refreshed to flat white letters on a red background, expanded to include both first and last names. Pro Football Hall of Fame inductees are additionally denoted by a hall of fame logo next to their names.

All-Pro Team Selections
Many current and former members of the Buccaneers have been selected to the Associated Press All-Pro first and second teams. While the AP All-Pro teams are generally considered the highest nomination, Pro Football Writers of America, Newspaper Enterprise Association, Pro Football Weekly, Pro Football Focus, and The Sporting News have also nominated Buccaneers players to their All-Pro teams. 

Notes:
 † indicates a player earned a different first and second team nomination in the same year

Pro Bowl Selections
Many former and current Tampa Bay Buccaneers players have represented thefranchise in the Pro Bowl:

PFWA All-Rookie Team
Many members drafted by the Tampa Bay Buccaneers have been selected to the Pro Football Writers of America NFL All-Rookie Team:

A Football Life / The Timeline / Hard Knocks
Former Buccaneer players and seasons profiled on A Football Life and The Timeline:
 Warren Sapp
 Ronde Barber (along with his twin brother Tiki Barber)
 Doug Williams
 Keenan McCardell (along with his former Jacksonville Jaguars' teammate Jimmy Smith)
 John Lynch (scheduled for airdate of December 24, 2021)
 0–26 Bucs: The players of the 1976–1977 teams
 Hard Knocks: 2017 season
 America's Game: The Super Bowl Champions : 2002 season (XXXVII), 2020 season (LV)

Tampa Bay players

Tampa Bay starting quarterbacks

Tampa Bay draft picks

Staff and head coaches

Current staff

Head coaches

Culture

Tampa Bay Buccaneers Cheerleaders 
The Bucs created an official cheerleading squad in their first season, called the "Swash-Buc-Lers". In 1999, they were renamed as the "Tampa Bay Buccaneers Cheerleaders".

A Triumph of the Heart: The Ricky Bell Story

A Triumph of the Heart: The Ricky Bell Story is a made-for-television movie that recounts the life of the late Buccaneer running back Ricky Bell. The movie takes place through a dramatic reenactment of the 1981 season, including actual footage of gameplay around the dramatized role by Mario Van Peebles playing Bell himself. Bell finds himself befriending an impaired child who inspire each other to become better in their own ways. It also includes other former Buccaneer players, like Lee Roy Selmon, Charley Hannah, and Doug Williams (only through gameplay footage).

Rivals
The Buccaneers have rivalries several teams in the NFL, most notably with the other three teams in the NFC South, which include the following: the Atlanta Falcons, the Carolina Panthers, and the New Orleans Saints. Despite being places in the NFC South, the Buccaneers had fierce rivalries with the Chicago Bears, the Minnesota Vikings, the Detroit Lions, and the Green Bay Packers during their days in the NFC Central from 1977 to 2001, with their rivalry with the Packers being the most famous of the bunch. The Buccaneers also have a rivalry with the Philadelphia Eagles that began in the late 1970s but reached new heights during the early 2000s when the two teams met each other in the playoffs. The rivalry would return in the early 2020s when the two teams meet in January 2022 when Buccaneers knocked Philly out of the playoffs. The Buccaneers also have geographical rivalries with the Jacksonville Jaguars and Miami Dolphins.

Divisional rivalries

Carolina Panthers 
The Buccaneers and Panthers first meet in 1995, back when the later team joined the NFL as expansion franchise. However, the rivalry would take off during the 2000s with the creation of the NFC South and was described as "heated" and "physical" due to two main reasons; the first being that both teams fought for dominating control over the NFC South throughout most of the 2000s. The second reason being that players on both franchises suffered season ending injuries during their annual games. Examples include Chris Simms, Dante Wesley, Clifton Smith, and Kavika Pittman. Carolina leads the rivalry 25-19.

New Orleans Saints
The Saints and Buccaneers have one noticeable parallel throughout the two franchises history, they were both regarded as unsuccessful franchises until the 21st century, which was both teams were placed in the NFC South in 2002, as well as when their rivalry would truly begin to take off, when both teams improved their fortunes, though the Buccaneers got over the hump first with by winning Super Bowl XXXVII and the Saints winning their first Super Bowl 7 years later in Super Bowl XLIV. The first meeting between these two franchises first occurred in 1977 when the Buccaneers beat the Saints and ended their 26 game straight losing streak. While it isn't the most well known rivalry in the NFL, it did reach new heights in the 2000s, which was when the Buccaneers had a higher advantage over the Saints in the regular season, when both teams started posting winning seasons in that decade. New Orleans Saints leads the rivalry 39-24 and the two franchises meet once in the playoffs in which the Buccaneers defeated the Saints 30 to 20 and eventually won Super Bowl LV.

Radio and television

The Buccaneers' current flagship radio stations are WXTB 97.9 FM and WDAE 620 AM. The play-by-play announcer since 1989 has been Gene Deckerhoff. Former Bucs tight end Dave Moore joined Deckerhoff as analyst for the 2007 season. T. J. Rives works as the sideline reporter.

Broadcast legend and former Green Bay Packers' announcer Ray Scott was the play-by-play man for the Bucs' first two seasons in 1976 and 1977. Dick Crippen called the team's games in the first half of the 1978 season, with Jim Gallogly taking over for the second half. From 1979 to 1988 Mark Champion, who became the radio voice of the Detroit Lions (1989–2004) and then the Detroit Pistons (2001–present), held that position with the Bucs.

Former Buccaneer Hardy Nickerson served as color commentator for one season in 2006, until he signed with the Bears as a linebackers coach on February 23, 2007. Nickerson had replaced Scot Brantley, who was the commentator from 1999 through 2005. Jesse Ventura, the famous professional wrestler, actor, and former governor of Minnesota, was Deckerhoff's partner on the Bucs radio broadcasts for one year, 1990, and former Buc David Logan held that position after Ventura until his death after the 1998 season. Dave Kocerek and Fran Curci were also color commentators for the Buccaneers during their earlier years.

Ronnie Lane previously worked as a sideline reporter.

While regular-season and post-season games in the NFL are all broadcast by national television contracts on CBS, Fox, NBC, ESPN and NFL Network, the television broadcasts are for the most part handled by the individual teams. Effective with the 2011 season, preseason games not picked up for national broadcast are seen on WTSP. WESH simulcasts the broadcast in the Orlando area.

CBS, Fox and NBC games are shown respectively in Tampa Bay on WTSP, WTVT and WFLA-TV, while they are shown respectively in Orlando on WKMG, WOFL and WESH.  The great majority of games are aired on Fox owned-and-operated stations WTVT and WOFL, by virtue of Fox owning the rights to NFC games. WTSP and WKMG air any Buccaneers home games against American Football Conference teams. Monday Night Football games on ESPN and Thursday night games on NFL Network are simulcast locally on WMOR-TV, who also previously carried the Bucs' Sunday Night Football games when they were televised on ESPN and TNT; previously, the Bucs' appearances on the cable networks were seen locally on WFLA-TV and WFTS.

WFLA was the previous home to Buccaneers preseason games, where they were televised from 2003 to 2010. At WFLA, Chris Myers was the play-by-play announcer with John Lynch as color commentator. Both Myers and Lynch worked nationally with Fox Sports at the time until Lynch became the general manager of the San Francisco 49ers in 2017. Ron Jaworski previously served as color commentator, until he signed with Monday Night Football for 2007. Charles Davis also served as color commentator from 2007 to 2008.

WTOG channel 44 also previously broadcast Buccaneers preseason games for many years, ending in 2002. Former CBS play-by-play and ESPN golf broadcaster Jim Kelly was the play-by-play announcer for many of those games in the 1980s, and Joe Namath was a commentator.

In the early years of the franchise, WTVT, then a CBS affiliate, broadcast some Buccaneers preseason games. Sports anchor Andy Hardy handled the play-by-play, and for one game in 1978, his broadcast partner was his friend, Florida State alumni, and movie actor Burt Reynolds.

Notes

References

External links

 
 Tampa Bay Buccaneers at the National Football League official website

 
National Football League teams
American football teams in Florida
American football teams in Tampa, Florida
American football teams established in 1976
1976 establishments in Florida